Shepherd Building may refer to:

Shepherd Building (Montgomery, Alabama), listed on the National Register of Historic Places (NRHP) in Montgomery County, Alabama
Shepherd Building Group, York, UK
Shepherd Hardware, Paris, Idaho, NRHP-listed in Bear Lake County
Shepherd Building (Shreveport, Louisiana), listed on the National Register of Historic Places in Caddo Parish, Louisiana
Shepard Company Building, Providence, Rhode Island, listed on the National Register of Historic Places in Providence, Rhode Island
Shepherd's Mill, Shepherdstown, West Virginia, NRHP-listed
Shepherd Hall, Wheeling, West Virginia, NRHP-listed

See also
Shepherd House (disambiguation)